Sailing/Yachting is an Olympic sport starting from the Games of the 1st Olympiad (1896 Olympics in Athens, Greece). With the exception of 1904 and the canceled 1916 Summer Olympics, sailing has always been included on the Olympic schedule. The Sailing program of 1948 consisted of a total of five sailing classes (disciplines). For each class seven races were scheduled from 3–12 August 1948 Torquay/Torbay, on England's south coast.

The sailing was done on the triangular type Olympic courses. The start was made in the center of a set of 8 numbered marks that were places in a circle. During the starting procedure the sequence of the marks was communicated to the sailors. By picking the mark that was most upwind the start could always be made upwind. This system is, at least in certain German lakes, still in use.

Great Britain's last surviving Gold Medal Champion from the 1948 Summer Olympics, was David Bond who sailed for Great Britain in the Swallow Class.

Venue 

As we quote from the official report: "Torquay was, perhaps, an inevitable choice as the venue. It is exposed only to easterly winds, which are rare in summer. Moreover, it is remarkably free from strong tides and currents and other navigational hazards, and thus there is nothing or next to nothing to be gained from the " local knowledge " which is so profitable in difficult waters."

The sailing event had, since the distance to the London area a, separate opening ceremony which took place in Torquay. The opening was made by IOC chairman: Mr. J. Sigfrid Edstrom.

A 14-nm course was created for the Dragons and 6 Metres. The Star and Swallow sailed a little more inshore on a 10-nm course, while for the Firefly a 6-nm course was set close to the coast.

The closing ceremony was observed by 10,000 spectators. The medals were handed by Sir Ralph Gore, President of the International Yacht Racing Union.

Competition

Overview

Continents 
 Africa
 Oceania
 Europe
 Americas

Countries

Classes (equipment) 
Prior to 1948, sailing had been a gender-neutral sport where male and female competitors competed together. For the 1948 Games the IOC decided the events should only be open to male sailors. This was the only time this happened until separate male and female events were introduced in some classes in the 1980s.

 = Male,  = Female,  = Open

Medal summary

Medal table

Remarks

Sailing 
 Modern techniques like hot moulded plywood in an autoclave and Aluminum mast, booms and decks made their entrance in the Firefly.
 This Olympic sailing event was gender independent, but turned out to be a Men-only event. This was one of the triggers to create gender specific events forty years later. This however had to wait until 1988.
 The series were scheduled over the two Olympic weeks. race 1–4 in each class were sailed from 3–6 August. race 5–7 took place on 10–12 August. This was done so that boats could be overhauled after the first set of races.
 The best feature of this Olympic was the scoring system. Quote from the officiel report: – "The number of points awarded to each other competitor diminishes under a given formula, according to the placing of his boat at the finish." – This system was invented by an Austrian sailor. Advantages of this system are:
 Winning races is well awarded, so sailors are likely to fight till the end of the race for each place
 Less ties than with the point for place system
 The score of the winner reflects the number of entries
 Together with the scoring system it was introduced that each team could discard its worst result
 The courses were laid and patrolled by vessels of the Royal Navy
 The two major Axis powers of World War II, Germany and Japan, were not invited to the Games.

Sailors 
During the Sailing regattas at the 1948 Summer Olympics among others the following persons were competing in the various classes:
 , The future designer of the Finn, in the Firefly
 , The future designer of the Vaurien, in the Firefly. He also designed the "Herbulot"-spinnaker. (A spinnaker with large circulair holes. This makes large spinnakers more stable and faster. This type of spinnaker is now in most classes prohibited).
 , Between 1949 and 1956 he won eight consecutive European championships in the starboat class, here also in the Star
 , Oldest of the Sieburger-Salas "clan". A family that in total had 20 entries in the Olympic Sailing competition, in the 6 Metre
 , Two times gold and twice silver medalist since 1920, in the 6 Metre
 , Spanned the longest periode in Olympic sailing (1908–1948), in the 6 Metre
 , Although he did not finish the first race he won his first, out of four consecutive, Gold medals. This one in the Firefly.
 , Jock Sturrock in the Star. Became the first Australian to sail in the Olympic Games. He would eventually represent Australia in four Olympic Games, and be flag-bearer for the Australian team at the opening ceremony of the 1960 Rome Olympics (in recognition of becoming the first athlete to represent Australia at four Olympic Games). He later skippered "Gretel" and "Dame Pattie", the first two Australian challengers for the America's Cup.

Notes

References 
 

 

 
1948 Summer Olympics events
1948
1948 in sailing
Sailing competitions in the United Kingdom